This is a list of the NCAA outdoor champions in the 4x400 metres relay event.

Champions

References

External links
NCAA Division I women's outdoor track and field

NCAA Women's Division I Outdoor Track and Field Championships
Outdoor track, women
4x4 relay